Marcenat may refer to the following places in France:

 Marcenat, Allier, a commune in the department of Allier
 Marcenat, Cantal, a commune in the department of Cantal